Effective Perl Programming, sometimes known as the Shiny Ball Book by Perl programmers, is an intermediate to advanced text by Joseph N. Hall covering the Perl programming language. Randal L. Schwartz contributed a foreword and technical editing.

Effective Perl Programming follows the numbered "rules" format begun in Scott Meyers' Effective C++. A small number of errors were corrected in the 2nd and 4th printings.

An expanded second edition, Effective Perl Programming: Ways to Write Better, More Idiomatic Perl, 2/E. by Hall, Joshua A McAdams, and brian d foy was published in 2010 by Pearson.

External links
 Effective Perl Programming (Joseph Hall) - review at dannyreviews.com
 A link to a review of the 2nd ed. at books.dzone.com could not be posted on the page because that site is blacklisted by Wikipedia
 The Effective Perler, brian d foy's blog, where he discusses topics from the 2nd edition

References 
 The publisher’s description of the book

Books about Perl